Michael Roman is an American political operative and opposition researcher. Roman was a staffer for President Donald Trump from 2017 to 2018. He subsequently worked for the Trump 2020 campaign. Prior to working for Trump, Roman ran an in-house intelligence unit for the Koch brothers.

Roman has a history of making misleading and unsubstantiated claims about voter fraud. On Election Day in 2020, he posted baseless and deceptive claims of voter fraud. He delivered the list of false electors for Michigan and Wisconsin to US Representative Mike Kelly who provided them to US Senator Ron Johnson. Staff of Ron Johnson tried to get these lists to Vice President Mike Pence before the count of the electoral votes on January 6, 2021.

On September 12, 2022, the New York Times reported that agents of the U.S. Justice Department seized Roman’s cell phone in conjunction with 40 subpoenas issued in the investigation of the false electors.

Career

He began his career as a Republican Party activist in Philadelphia, his hometown.
Early in his career Roman was a political consultant in his home state of Pennsylvania and in New Jersey. He worked for State Representative John Perzel and ran the 56th Ward in Northeast Philadelphia for him until Perzel was indicted and later  went to prison . He was director of Election Day operations at the Republican National Committee.   He has been employed by the presidential campaigns of George W. Bush, Rudy Giuliani, and John McCain.  Roman also served as chief of staff to former Illinois Congressman Bobby Schilling.

Roman was a senior advisor on the 2016 Trump campaign as the campaign's chief poll watcher.

Prior to joining the Trump presidential campaign, Roman headed up an intelligence gathering operation for Charles and David Koch, industrialists and high-profile Republican donors.  The now-defunct office surveilled and gathered intelligence on liberal opponents of conservative policies.

Roman describes his blog Election Journal as dedicated to "fraud, cheating, dirty tricks, absurdity and other election news." According to Richard L. Hasen, Chancellor's Professor of Law and Political Science at the University of California, Irvine, the blog appears to focus, "only on incidents favoring Republican's claims against Democrats. During the 2008 presidential election, Election Monitoring, combined GoogleMaps, with Twitter, Flickr and YouTube to enable voters and poll watchers to post what they saw as instances of voter disenfranchisement and election fraud in a real time, online map.

White House role
Roman's role in the Trump White House as Director of Special Projects and Research, which Politico calls a "a vague title that reveals almost nothing," has drawn attention because in previous administrations it was usual for opposition researchers to work for the campaign or on the staff of the presidential transition team, rather than directly for the White House.  He left the White House in April 2018.

References

American political consultants
Trump administration personnel
Opposition research
Pennsylvania Republicans
Living people
1972 births